Amata kenredi is a moth of the family Erebidae. It was described by Rothschild in 1910. It is found in the Democratic Republic of Congo and Uganda.

References

 Natural History Museum Lepidoptera generic names catalog

kenredi
Moths described in 1910
Moths of Africa